A National Security Group is a non-governmental organization (NGO), think-tank, research center, or institute that formulates national security theories and finds solutions to defense challenges through research, education, and development.  These organizations differ from other NGOs and think tanks by not only producing original concepts and solutions but also by finding the necessary means and mechanisms to implement them.

Covering a broad range of areas, from defense strategy to national security and defense innovation, a national security group integrates theory, policy, science, law, and technology.

Usually operating as non-profit organizations, national security groups also partner with government agencies, other NGOs, international organizations (e.g. United Nations), industry, academia, foundations, and private donors in order to fund research and development, thus benefiting both partners and national security as a whole.  Although classical think tanks tend to merely generate ideas, national security groups research, design, and produce innovative defense concepts necessary for a nation's security.

National security institutions